Alexander Forbes "Alister" Clark (6 November 1903 – 14 January 1987) was an Irish hurdler. He competed in the men's 110 metres hurdles at the 1928 Summer Olympics.

References

1903 births
1987 deaths
Athletes (track and field) at the 1928 Summer Olympics
Irish male hurdlers
Olympic athletes of Ireland
Place of birth missing